Lópe de Alarcón was a Roman Catholic prelate who served as Bishop of Bitonto (1532–1537).

Biography
Lópe de Alarcón was born in Spain.
On 17 May 1532, he was appointed during the papacy of Pope Clement VII as Bishop of Bitonto,
He served as Bishop of Bitonto until his resignation in 1537.

References

External links and additional sources
 (for Chronology of Bishops) 
 (for Chronology of Bishops) 

16th-century Italian Roman Catholic bishops
Bishops appointed by Pope Clement VII
Bishops of Bitonto